The Former Residence of Xu Teli or Xu Teli's Former Residence was built in the late Qing dynasty (1644–1911). It is located in Wumei Township, Changsha County, Hunan.

History
The house was built by Xu's grandfather during the Tongzhi period (1862–1874) of the Qing dynasty (1644–1911).

In 1988, it was listed as one of Hunan's most important culture and relics site.

In August 2005, it was rebuilt by the People's Government of Changsha County and it was opened to the public.

In 2013, it was listed as one of "Major National Historical and Cultural Sites in Hunan"  by the State Council of China.

References

Bibliography
 

Changsha County
Buildings and structures in Changsha
Qing dynasty architecture
Traditional folk houses in Hunan